Mike Katz, known professionally as Harvey Sutherland is an Australian producer, bandleader and synthesist from Melbourne, Victoria, Australia. His debut studio album Boy was released in April 2022.

Career

2010–2021: Career beginnings
In 2011 Mike Kay released Wooshie & Mike Kay EP with Wooshie.
 
In 2013, Harvey Sutherland began to make international waves with a series of successful 12" records.
 
In November 2016, Sutherland released Priestess / Bravado on Clarity Recordings, an imprint established by Sutherland himself.

2022: Boy
In April 2022, Sutherland released his debut studio album, Boy. The album was recorded during the pandemic in London, Los Angeles and Melbourne, and was "shaped by Katz's own personal neuroses concerning himself, past relationships, the frustrations of modern society, and his obsessive, never-ending search for the perfect funk". The album was nominated for two awards at the 2022 ARIA Music Awards.

In February 2023, Sutherland released the stand-alone single entitled "Changes", which include an interpolation of the 2002 Sandy Rivera song of the same name.

Discography

Studio albums

Extended plays

Awards and nominations

ARIA Music Awards
The ARIA Music Awards is an annual awards ceremony that recognises excellence, innovation, and achievement across all genres of Australian music. They commenced in 1987.

! 
|-
| rowspan="2"| 2022
| rowspan="2"| Boy
| Michael Gudinski Breakthrough Artist
| 
| rowspan="2"| 
|-
| Best Dance/Electronic Release
| 
|-

Music Victoria Awards
The Music Victoria Awards are an annual awards night celebrating Victorian music. They commenced in 2006.

! 
|-
| 2017
| Harvey Sutherland
| Best Electronic Act
| 
| 
|-
| rowspan="2"| 2022
| Harvey Sutherland
| Best Electronic Work
| 
| 
|-
| Boy
| Best Victorian Album
| 
| 
|-

References

 
Year of birth missing (living people)
21st-century Australian musicians
Living people
Musicians from Melbourne